Midnight is a 1998 Brazilian-French drama film directed by Walter Salles and Daniela Thomas for the 2000, Seen By... series.

Cast
Fernanda Torres as Maria
Luiz Carlos Vasconcelos as João
Matheus Nachtergaele as Francisco
Nelson Sargento as Vovô
Tonico Pereira as Carcereiro
Áulio Ribeiro
Luciana Bezerra
Antônio Gomes
Nelson Dantas
Carlos Vereza
José Dumont

Production
Its production was ordered by the Franco-German TV network Arte that asked ten filmmakers of different countries about the turn of the century for the 2000, Seen By... project. A co-production with France, it was produced in three weeks with a low budget.

Reception
It won the 2000 Ariel Award for Best Ibero-American Film, and the 1st Grande Prêmio Cinema Brasil for Best Actor (Nachtergaele), Director and Screenplay.

References

External links

1998 films
Films directed by Walter Salles
Films directed by Daniela Thomas
Brazilian drama films
1998 drama films
Films scored by Antônio Pinto
1990s Portuguese-language films